Castilleja plagiotoma, the Mojave Indian paintbrush, is a hemiparasitic perennial plant with green flowers that grows in deserts of California. It is in the Castilleja genus of the broomrape plant family. It is included in the CNPS Inventory of Rare and Endangered Plants.

References

plagiotoma
Flora of California
Flora without expected TNC conservation status